USS Harrison may refer to:

, was a schooner chartered for the Continental Navy in 1775 and decommissioned in 1776
, was a  launched in 1942 and transferred to Mexico in 1968

United States Navy ship names